A currier is a specialist in the leather processing industry.

Currier may also refer to:

Currier (surname), a surname (including a list of people with the name)
USS Currier (DE-700), a former destroyer escort of the United States Navy
Currier House (disambiguation), various buildings
Currier Museum of Art, Manchester, New Hampshire

See also
Rauhut–Currier reaction
Courier (disambiguation)